The Health Care Choice Act is a bill that proposes allowing health insurance companies to sell health insurance across U.S. state lines.

Health Care Choice Act of 2005 

H.R.2355 gained 71 Republican co-sponsors in the House (Rep. Ed Towns (D-NY) signed on as a co-sponsor a day before and withdrew as a co-sponsor two days after the hearing on the bill) and S.1015 gained 3 Republican co-sponsors in the Senate.

On June 28, 2005, a hearing on H.R 2335 was held by the House Subcommittee on Health of the Committee on Energy and Commerce with five invited witnesses. 
Three witnesses testified in favor of H.R.2355:
 Robert Garcia de Posada, Chairman and President of The Latino Coalition and former Director of Hispanic Affairs at the Republican National Committee under Lee Atwater
 Merrill Matthews, Jr., Director of the Council for Affordable Health Insurance (CAHI) (a research and advocacy association of health insurance companies active in the individual market)
 David Gratzer, Senior Fellow at the Manhattan Institute and a Canadian psychiatry resident
Two witnesses testified against H.R.2355:
 Mike Kreidler, Washington State Insurance Commissioner on behalf of the National Association of Insurance Commissioners
 L. Hunter Limbaugh, Chair of the Advocacy Committee of the American Diabetes Association

On July 20, 2005, the House Committee on Energy and Commerce by a vote of 24 to 23 (24 Republicans in favor, 21 Democrats and 2 Republicans opposed) ordered H.R.2355 reported favorably out of committee, which it was on February 16, 2006, and subsequently died with no further action in the full House. S.1015 died in committee.

Health Care Choice Act of 2007 

This plan was analyzed by Sven R Larson in a white paper for Center for Freedom and Prosperity. Larson finds considerable cost savings from interstate health-insurance market competition.

Health Care Choice Act of 2009 

Legislative history

References 

  
 
 
  (2:07:30)
 
 
 
Proposed legislation of the 108th United States Congress
Proposed legislation of the 109th United States Congress
Proposed legislation of the 110th United States Congress
Proposed legislation of the 111th United States Congress
Proposed legislation of the 112th United States Congress
Proposed legislation of the 113th United States Congress
Proposed legislation of the 114th United States Congress
Proposed legislation of the 115th United States Congress
United States proposed federal health legislation